The Camiguin hanging parrot (Loriculus camiguinensis) is a hanging parrot endemic to the Philippine island of Camiguin, where its habitat is diminishing.  The taxonomy of this population of parrots on Camiguin is uncertain.

Description
The Camiguin hanging parrot is mostly green with blue throat, face and thighs, and a red tail and red crown. Males and female birds look identical, which is unusual for a hanging parrot native to the Philippines. Only the males of all the other populations living on other islands have a red area on their fronts.

Taxonomy
In 2006, the hanging parrots living on the island of Camiguin, off the northern coast of Mindanao, were described as a separate species than the Philippine hanging parrot (Loriculus philippensis). However, more research and DNA analysis is required to clarify their taxonomy.

References

Newly Described Camiguin Hanging Parrot
Two new species discovered, bolster case for Philippine conservation

External links
Oriental Bird Images: Camiguin Hanging Parrot  Selected photos

Camiguin hanging parrot
Endemic birds of the Philippines
Fauna of Camiguin
Camiguin hanging parrot